Harry Newsham Bentz was an American college football player and coach. He was a member of the 1922 College Football All-America Team and starting center for the 1922 Penn State Nittany Lions football team. Bentz served as the head football coach at Mansfield University of Pennsylvania in 1923 and at Shippensburg University of Pennsylvania from 1924 to 1925 and 1927 to 1928, compiling a career college football coaching record of 24–15–2.

References

Year of birth missing
Year of death missing
American football centers
College men's basketball head coaches in the United States
Mansfield Mounties football coaches
Mansfield Mountaineers men's basketball coaches
Penn State Nittany Lions football players
Shippensburg Red Raiders football coaches